Charles Henry Fowler (August 11, 1837 – March 20, 1908) was a Canadian-American bishop of the Methodist Episcopal Church (elected in 1884) and President of Northwestern University in Evanston, Illinois from 1872 to 1876.

Early life
Charles was born in Burford Ontario, Canada.  At the age of four he was taken to Illinois, United States. Charles spent some time at the Rock River Seminary in Illinois.  Then he entered the Genesee Wesleyan Seminary at Lima,  Livingston County, New York (which became Syracuse University), graduating in 1859.  He received the honors of his class and had been the student of another President of Northwestern University, Joseph Cummings, who taught at the seminary from 1854–1867.
He matriculated at the Garrett Biblical Institute (connected to Northwestern University) in Evanston, Illinois, from which he graduated in 1861.

At one time he was engaged to Frances E. Willard, famous suffragette and first dean of women of Northwestern University.  Their split eventually resulted in her ouster from that position by Fowler.

Ordained ministry
The Rev. Fowler joined the Rock River Annual Conference in 1861.  He served in the pastorate for twelve years, all in the city of Chicago.  He collected $40,000 in Eastern cities for the relief of Chicago's churches following the Great Chicago Fire. 
In 1872 the Rev. Dr. Fowler became the president of Northwestern University in Evanston, having declined this same position in 1861.  Four years later he was made Editor of the Christian Advocate based in New York City, an important Methodist periodical of that day.  In 1880 he was elected missionary secretary of his denomination.
In 1884 he was elected to the episcopacy by the General Conference of the M.E. Church.  During a large part of his episcopal service his residence was in San Francisco.

Founding the College of Puget Sound
Dr. Fowler was also the main founder of the College of Puget Sound (now the University of Puget Sound). He came up with the idea while in Tacoma, Washington for a Methodist conference.

Founding Universities in China

Dr. Fowler was the founder of Yenching University and University of Nanking in China.

See also
 List of bishops of the United Methodist Church
 List of Northwestern University presidents

References

External links

Syracuse University alumni
1837 births
1908 deaths
Bishops of the Methodist Episcopal Church
American Methodist bishops
Methodist ministers
Methodist writers
People from Evanston, Illinois
People from the County of Brant
Presidents of Northwestern University
Northwestern University alumni
19th-century American newspaper editors
Editors of Christian publications
American print editors
Genesee Wesleyan Seminary alumni
Journalists from Illinois
19th-century American clergy